A Long Journey is a 1967 Chilean drama film influenced by Italian neorealism and the French New Wave.

Plot 
A young boy from the impoverished neighborhoods of Santiago, Chile roams the city in search of his recently deceased newborn brother, known as 'el angelito'. The boy wishes to return the wings he believes the baby lost at his wake, as he believes his brother cannot enter heaven without them.

Cast 
 Enrique Kaulen - Boy
 Eliana Vidal - Unfaithful rich wife
 Fabio Zerpa - Rich wife's lover
 Rubén Ubeira - Boy's father
 María Castiglione - Boy's mother 
 Emilio Gaete - Cuckolded rich husband
 Julio Tapia
 Hector Duvauchelle

References

External links 

1967 films
1960s Spanish-language films
Chilean drama films
Chilean black-and-white films